Cryoglobulinemic purpura is a skin condition characterized by purpura and occurring most frequently in multiple myeloma and macroglobulinemia.

See also 
 Cryoglobulinemia
 Skin lesion

References 

Vascular-related cutaneous conditions